Anton Lysyuk (born 26 February 1987) is a Ukrainian former professional footballer who played as a midfielder.

Career
Lysyuk joined Tatran Prešov on free transfer in winter 2012, signing a half-year deal.

References

External links

1. FC Tatran Prešov profile

1987 births
Living people
People from Berdychiv
Ukrainian footballers
Association football midfielders
Ukrainian First League players
Uzbekistan Super League players
Slovak Super Liga players
FC Nistru Otaci players
FC Rubin Kazan players
FC Oleksandriya players
FC Arsenal-Kyivshchyna Bila Tserkva players
FC Qizilqum Zarafshon players
1. FC Tatran Prešov players
FC Zirka Kropyvnytskyi players
Ukrainian expatriate sportspeople in Moldova
Expatriate footballers in Moldova
Ukrainian expatriate sportspeople in Russia
Expatriate footballers in Russia
Ukrainian expatriate sportspeople in Uzbekistan
Expatriate footballers in Uzbekistan
Ukrainian expatriate sportspeople in Slovakia
Expatriate footballers in Slovakia
Sportspeople from Zhytomyr Oblast